Alan Gregg may refer to:

 Alan Gregg (physician) (1890–1957), an American physician and Rockefeller Foundation officer
 Alan Gregg (musician), a New Zealand musician
 Allan Gregg, a Canadian political pundit